Zoran Jovanović (born 25 September 1986) is a Swedish footballer who plays for Österlen FF.

Career

Club career
Ahead of the 2020 season, Jovanović signed a one-year deal with Swedish second division club Österlen FF. Ahead of the 2021 season, Jovanović was given a role as a playing assistant coach at the club. In November 2021, he became temporary head coach for the final two games of the season after Agim Sopi was allowed to leave the club fired.

References

External links

Zoran Jovanovic at sportsmole
Zoran Jovanovic at soccerpunter

1986 births
Living people
Association football midfielders
Swedish footballers
Trelleborgs FF players
IF Limhamn Bunkeflo (men) players
Allsvenskan players
Superettan players
Ettan Fotboll players
Swedish people of Finnish descent
Swedish people of Serbian descent